Doaba , is a town and union council of Mianwali District in the Punjab province of Pakistan. It is located in Piplan Tehsil at 32°20'1N 71°23'44E. 

Railway Station Bhumb named after main populated clan "Bhumb". In the West is River Indus and in the East is Main Thal Canal. It is the main historical town of the Tehsil Piplan. Included in the Union Council is Chak no 2ML village, also known as Jamal Abad in honour of the late brigadier Jamal Dad Khan. Governmental general K Nazimul Deen came to this village in 1949.Famous sher shah suri road crosses this town.

References

Union councils of Mianwali District
Populated places in Mianwali District